Xuan is a unisex given name.

In Chinese or Vietnamese language
 Ai Xuan (born 1947), Chinese painter
 An Xuan (2nd century), Parthian translator
 Eoon Qi Xuan (born 2000), Malaysian badminton player
 Fu Xuan (217–278), Chinese poet
 Ge Xuan (164–244), Chinese Taoist
 Han Xuan (151–210), Chinese governor
 Hou Xuan (3rd century), Chinese military officer
 Huan Xuan (369–404), Chinese emperor
 Jin Xuan (died 209), Chinese personage of the Three Kingdoms
 Liu Xuan (emperor) (died 25), Chinese emperor of the Han Dynasty
 Liu Xuan (gymnast) (born 1979), Chinese artistic gymnast
 Liu Xuan (Three Kingdoms) (died 264), Chinese imperial prince
 Pei Xuan, a Water Margin character
 Qian Xuan (1235–1305), Chinese painter
 Qiao Xuan (108–183), Chinese general
 Wang Xuan (1937–2006), Chinese scientist
 Wang Xuan (Second Zhou) (7th century), Chinese chancellor
 Xiahou Xuan (209–254), Chinese politician
 Xie Xuan (343–388), Chinese general
 Xuân Thủy (c. 1912–85), North Vietnamese political figure
 Zhang Xuan (713–755), Chinese painter
 Zheng Xuan (127-200), Chinese philosopher
 Zhou Xuan (1918–57), Chinese singer

In Asturian language
Xuan Bello  (born 1965), Spanish writer

Chinese given names